There are yet unsolved problems in neuroscience, although some of these problems have evidence supporting a hypothesized solution, and the field is rapidly evolving. One major problem is even enumerating what would belong on a list such as this. However, these problems include:

Consciousness
 Consciousness: 
What is the neural basis of subjective experience, cognition, wakefulness, alertness, arousal, and attention? 
Is there a "hard problem of consciousness"? 
If so, how is it solved? 
What, if any, is the function of consciousness?

Sensation, perception and movement
 Perception: 
How does the brain transfer sensory information into coherent, private percepts? 
What are the rules by which perception is organized? 
What are the features/objects that constitute our perceptual experience of internal and external events? 
How are the senses integrated? 
What is the relationship between subjective experience and the physical world?

Learning and memory
 Learning and memory: 
Where do our memories get stored and how are they retrieved again? 
How can learning be improved? 
What is the difference between explicit and implicit memories? 
What molecule is responsible for synaptic tagging?
 Neuroplasticity: How plastic is the mature brain?
 Cognition and decisions: 
How and where does the brain evaluate reward value and effort (cost) to modulate behavior? 
How does previous experience alter perception and behavior? 
What are the genetic and environmental contributions to brain function?

Language
 Language: 
How is it implemented neurally? 
What is the basis of semantic meaning?

Mind-body connection
Free will, particularly the neuroscience of free will.

 Sleep: 
What is the biological function of sleep? 
Why do we dream? 
What are the underlying brain mechanisms? 
What is its relation to anesthesia?

Computational neuroscience
Computational theory of mind: What are the limits of understanding thinking as a form of computing?
Computational neuroscience: 
How important is the precise timing of action potentials for information processing in the neocortex? 
Is there a canonical computation performed by cortical columns? 
How is information in the brain processed by the collective dynamics of large neuronal circuits? 
What level of simplification is suitable for a description of information processing in the brain? 
What is the neural code?
 How do general anesthetics work?

 Noogenesis - the emergence and evolution of intelligence: What are the laws and mechanisms - of new idea emergence (insight, creativity synthesis, intuition, decision-making, eureka); development (evolution) of an individual mind in the ontogenesis, etc.?

References

External links
 The Human Brain Project Homepage

Neuroscience
Science-related lists